Antipater I of Macedon (Greek: Ἀντίπατρος), was the son of Cassander and Thessalonike of Macedon, who was a half-sister of Alexander the Great. He was king of Macedon from 297 BC until 294 BC, jointly with his brother Alexander V. Eventually, he murdered his mother and ousted his brother from the throne. Alexander turned to Pyrrhus and Demetrius I Poliorcetes for help, and Demetrius I overthrew Antipater and then had Alexander murdered. Antipater was killed by Lysimachus, after he fled from Demetrius I to Thrace. His wife was Eurydice, his paternal cousin who was a daughter of Lysimachus. He and his brother were the last kings of Macedon to be descended from Perdiccas I.

References

External links
Justinus's account of the killing of Antipater I
Plutarch's account of the ousting of Antipater I

3rd-century BC Macedonian monarchs
Ancient Macedonian monarchs
3rd-century BC rulers
Murdered royalty of Macedonia (ancient kingdom)
Year of birth unknown
Matricides
3rd-century BC Greek people
4th-century BC births
3rd-century BC deaths
Antipatrid dynasty

zh:安提帕特二世